Yemen competed at the 1992 Summer Paralympics in Barcelona, Spain. The delegation consisted of two competitors: A. M. Al-Hamdany in track and field athletics, and Said Al-Huribi in both track and field athletics and swimming. A third man, table tennis player Shaif Al-Kawlany, was registered for the games but did not compete.

Athletics

Swimming

See also 
 Yemen at the 1992 Summer Olympics

References

Nations at the 1992 Summer Paralympics
1992
Paralympics